A public open space is defined as an open piece of land both green space or hard space to which there is public access.

Public open space is often referred to by urban planners and landscape architects by the acronym 'POS'. Varied interpretations of the term are possible.

'Public' can mean:
 owned by a national or local government body
 owned by 'public' body (e.g. a not-for-profit organization) and held in trust for the public
 owned by a private individual or organization but made available for public use or available public access, see privately owned public space (POPS)

'Open' can mean:
 open for public access
 open for public recreation
 outdoors, i.e. not a space within a building
 vegetated

Depending on which of these definitions are adopted, any of the following could be called Public Open Space:

 a public park
 a town square
 a greenway which is open to the public but runs through farmland or a forest
 a public highway
 a private road with public access

See also
Environmental good
Landscape architecture
Landscape planning
Public good
Public space

External links
 Project for Public Space – information on creating and sustaining public places
 CABEspace – a government agency for good public park design in England
 Urban Land Institute – information on the use of land to enhance the environment.

Landscape
Open space